The leaping barb or flying minnow (Laubuka caeruleostigmata), is a species of cyprinid fish found in the Mekong and the Chao Phraya.

References

Laubuka
Cyprinid fish of Asia
Fish described in 1931